Warr Acres is the debut studio album from contemporary worship music band Warr Acres. The album released on August 23, 2011 by DREAM Records. Band members' Chris Crow and Jaron Nix produced the album. The album met with commercial charting successes, and mostly mixed reviews but overall barely positive reception.

Critical reception

Warr Acres received generally mixed reviews but overall barely positive reception from music critics. Andrew Greer of CCM Magazine rated the album three stars, and stated that "Though there is nothing new here, Acres offers plenty to enjoy." At Jesus Freak Hideout, Scott Fryberger rated the album three stars, and wrote that their music is all over the map and it needs some honing in, which he noted that the band has the potential to grow and evolve to make better music. Tony Cummings of Cross Rhythms rated the album eight out of ten squares, and called the album "highly impressive". At Christian Music Zine, Tyler Hess rated it three stars, and evoked that the album was not "musical genius by any means, but at least it is a little more fun than the typical fare."

Track listing

Charts

References

2011 debut albums
Warr Acres (band) albums